The Mayor of Borama is head of the executive branch of Borama City, the capital of Awdal region. The current mayor is Mohamed Ahmed Warsame, who was elected on 17 June, 2021.

List of mayors

See also
 Mayor of Berbera
 Mayor of Burao
 Mayor of Erigavo
 Mayor of Hargeisa
 Mayor of Las Anod

References

Mayors of places in Somaliland